Edgewater is an architecturally significant, early 19th-century house located near the hamlet of Barrytown in Dutchess County, New York, United States. Built about 1824, the house is a contributing property to the Hudson River Historic District. Edgewater's principal architectural feature is a monumental colonnade of six Doric columns, looking out across a lawn to the Hudson River. Writing in 1942, the historians Eberlein and Hubbard described Edgewater as an exemplar of "the combined dignity and subtle grace that marked the houses of the Federal Era."

History

1820–1853 (Livingston Family)
The history of Edgewater dates back to December 23, 1819, when Bishop Hobart of New York City married "Lowndes Brown, esq. of Charleston S.C. to Miss Margaretta Livingston, daughter of John R. Livingston, esq." The groom, Rawlins Lowndes Brown (1792–1852), was a graduate of Yale, class of 1806, and had been (as recently as September 1819 when he resigned his commission) Captain Lowndes Brown in charge of Company G stationed on Governors Island.

In 1824, possibly as a belated wedding gift, John R. Livingston (1755-1851) gave the 250-acre Edgewater property to his daughter and son-in-law, and the house may have been built about that time.

After the death of her father in 1851 and her husband in 1852, Margaret Livingston sold Edgewater to Robert Donaldson, after which she moved to London to live with her daughter.

1853–1902 (Donaldson Family)

The New York financier and aesthete Robert Donaldson Jr. (1800–1872) bought Edgewater in 1853. Donaldson engaged the architect Alexander Jackson Davis (1803–1892) to add an octagonal library wing, and to clad the brick house with stucco textured to resemble brownstone.  Davis also designed two gatehouses.

Robert Donaldson died in 1872, and as of 1880, his son, William, and his daughters Elizabeth and Isabella were living in the house with Isabella's husband, Robert Bronson, and five servants. 

In his 1894 guide to the Hudson River, Wallace Bruce wrote that Edgewater, "formerly the Donaldson home," was now owned by Edward Clark Goodwin, but Goodwin must have been renting the house, for in 1902, the executor of the Donaldson estate sold the house and south gatehouse to Elizabeth Chapman (1866–1937).

1902–1917 (Elizabeth Chanler Chapman)

Elizabeth Chapman was the second wife of the essayist John Jay Chapman. Born Elizabeth Astor Winthrop Chanler, the daughter of John Winthrop Chanler and Margaret Astor Ward, she grew up at Rokeby, a nearby house. Although Elizabeth Chapman never occupied Edgewater, her husband used it as a retreat during the winters of 1903-04 and 1904-05. In 1905, they moved into a new house designed by the architect Charles A. Platt, built on the hill above Edgewater and known as Sylvania. They used Edgewater as a guest house for family. In July 1906, her brother, the artist Robert Winthrop Chanler, was living there when lightning struck a nearby elm tree, causing a fire within the house that was quickly extinguished. Chapman's mother-in-law, Eleanor Jay Chapman (1839–1921), a great-granddaughter of Supreme Court Chief Justice John Jay, lived at Edgewater from 1910 until at least 1914.

1917–1946 (Conrad Chapman)

On March 3, 1917, Elizabeth Chapman recorded the deed by which she sold Edgewater (not including either gate house) to her stepson Conrad Chapman (1896–1989) for $1.00. It is unlikely, however, that he spent much time there during the next twenty years: The day before the sale, Chapman left Harvard College in order to join the Navy, in which he served until at least April 1920. According to Chapman's son, Geoffrey W. Chapman:
My father...had served in the Navy in World War I, had returned to Harvard afterwards to get his degree, and had then gone on to Oxford for a couple of
years, where his roommate at Oxford was Lester Pearson, who was later Prime Minister of Canada. He went on to get a doctorate at the Sorbonne in Paris in Byzantine history, and then became a headmaster of a school in France at a school for the sons of American diplomats and businessmen living in Europe. The school folded after a couple of years so he founded another school of his own, which didn’t last very long either. He came back to this country in the late ‘30s and had a series of jobs, although no real profession, apart from that of a scholar generally, because there was a lot of family money on both sides.Conrad Chapman's address in his 1921 NY Social Register entry was Oxford, England, and in the 1931 and 1936 editions, Paris. 

In England, on August 25, 1937, Chapman married Judith Daphne Kemp (1906-1999), who according to their son:
...was English-born and had been what the English call a governess in her early adult years. She married my father after they had known each other for just a few months in 1937, and then came to this country.

The couple traveled to America on the SS Bremen, leaving Southampton and arriving in New York on October 7th. By 1940, Chapman and his wife were living in Boston, According to Chapman's son, "We had a nice townhouse on Beacon Hill in Boston, smack in the middle of the city; one block below the famous Louisburg Square."

After they returned to America, the Chapmans were said to have spent time at Edgewater and to have made several improvements to the house, including the addition of an upstairs bathroom. 

In 1946, Conrad Chapman sold Edgewater to Laura M. Taylor for $1.00. He died in Boston in 1989.

1946–1950 (Laura M. Taylor)
Laura Scantlin married Robert Kirby Taylor at Pittsburg in 1907, and as of 1940, they were living at 444 East 58th Street in New York City, where Robert Taylor worked as a "woolen merchant." In November 1944, they were in Cold Spring, New York when their son's house was destroyed by fire. Sometime later, they leased Edgewater where Robert Taylor died in June 1946. One month later, Laura Taylor bought Edgewater, holding it until 1950 when she sold to the writer Gore Vidal.

1950–1969 (Gore Vidal)

Gore Vidal (1925-2012) bought Edgewater at the recommendation of his friend, Alice Astor Bouverie. In 1960, he ran as the Democratic candidate for Congress for the 29th Congressional District of New York State, using Edgewater as his campaign headquarters. He lost to the Republican candidate J. Ernest Wharton, by a margin of 57 percent to 43 percent. Among Vidal's supporters were Eleanor Roosevelt, Paul Newman and Joanne Woodward, all of whom spoke on his behalf. 

In November 1966, Vidal, now living in Italy, rented Edgewater to William vanden Heuvel (1930–2021), a lawyer, aide to Robert F. Kennedy, and husband of the writer Jean Stein (1934-2017). In 1969, Vidal sold Edgewater to New York financier Richard Jenrette for $125,000.

1969–2018 (Richard H. Jenrette)
When Richard Jenrette (1929–2018) bought Edgewater in 1969, the house sat on only 2.69 acres. During his tenure, Jenrette completed a restoration of the house and bought back much of the acreage (although not the two gatehouses). He also built two new buildings, a classical pavilion (1997) and a poolhouse (1998). Jenrette wrote about these additions in his memoir, Adventures with Old Houses:

In recent years, I've begun making more of my own architectural imprint on the Edgewater property. This past year I added a small neo-classical guest house, built on a point of land across the lagoon to the north of Edgewater—far enough away not to compete with the main house. Designed by Michael Dwyer of New York, the guest house is a small Grecian temple with four columns of the Doric order framing a large porch looking downriver. Viewed from the front porch of Edgewater across the lagoon, the new structure serves as an architectural folly extending the sweep of the landscape to the north.

Michael Dwyer also relocated the swimming pool and added a charming pool house, again in classical style with four Doric columns along the side of the pool. The effect is quite Roman—rather like a small corner of Hadrian's Villa. From guest house to pool house and back to the main house provides a scenic one-mile roundabout walk, mostly along the winding riverbank.

2018–Present (CAHPT)
Edgewater is currently owned by the Classical American Homes Preservation Trust, a foundation created by Richard Jenrette.

Maps

Drawings

Photographs

Further reading
Pieter Estersohn. Life Along the Hudson (New York, NY: Rizzoli, 2018).
Jane Garmey. Private Gardens of the Hudson Valley (New York, NY: Monacelli Press, 2013).
 David Schuyler. Sanctified Landscape: Writers, Artists, and the Hudson River Valley, 1820-1902. (Ithaca, NY: Cornell University Press, 2012).
Richard H. Jenrette. More Adventures with Old Houses (New York, NY: Classical American Homes Preservation Trust, 2010). . 
Michael Middleton Dwyer, editor, with a preface by Mark Rockefeller. Great Houses of the Hudson River (Boston, MA: Little, Brown and Company, published in association with Historic Hudson Valley, 2001). .
Richard H. Jenrette. Adventures with Old Houses (Charleston, SC: Wyrick & Co., 2000). .
Fred Kaplan. Gore Vidal: A Biography, (Doubleday, 1999). .
Jean Bradley Anderson. Carolinian on the Hudson: the Life of Robert Donaldson (Raleigh, NC: Historic Preservation Foundation of North Carolina, 1996).
Gore Vidal. Palimpsest: A Memoir (New York, NY: Random House, 1995). .
William Nathaniel Banks, Jr. "Living with Antiques: Edgewater on the Hudson River," The Magazine Antiques, vol. 121, no. 6 (June 1982), pp. 1400–1410.
Harold Donaldson Eberlin and Cortlandt Van Dyke Hubbard. Historic Houses of the Hudson Valley (New York, NY: Architectural Book Publishing Co., Inc., 1942).

External links

 Edgewater – Classical American Homes Preservation Trust website

References

Houses in Red Hook, New York
Neoclassical architecture in New York (state)
 Livingston family residences
Richard Jenrette
Chanler family
Michael Middleton Dwyer
 Gore Vidal